Senator Rosa may refer to:

Ángel Rosa (fl. 2010s), Senate of Puerto Rico
José Pérez Rosa (fl. 2010s), Senate of Puerto Rico

See also
Senator Rose (disambiguation)